The Men's marathon T10 was a marathon event in athletics at the 1996 Summer Paralympics, for totally blind athletes. Defending champion Carlo Durante of Italy took part, as did 1992 silver medallist Tofiri Kibuuka of Norway, and 1988 gold medallist Joerund Gaasemyr or Norway, holder of the Paralympic record in 2:45:48. Durante failed to defend his title, and took silver, finishing two and a half minutes behind Japan's Harumi Yanagawa, who had finished sixth four years earlier. The two Norwegians failed to obtain a place on the podium. Of the fourteen starters, eleven reached the finish line.

Results

See also
 Marathon at the Paralympics

References 

Men's marathon T10
1996 marathons
Marathons at the Paralympics
Men's marathons